= Atlanta Baptist College =

Atlanta Baptist College may refer to:

- Morehouse College, formerly known as Atlanta Baptist College
- Mercer University, which absorbed Atlanta Baptist College in 1972
